Acacias or Las Acacias is an administrative neighborhood (barrio) of Madrid belonging to the district of Arganzuela. As of 1 February 2020, it has a population of 37,049.

Geography

Acacias is located in city center and is crossed, at its south-eastern borders, by the river Manzanares. The ward has a pentagonal form, bordered by the roads Calle de Toledo, Ronda de Toledo, Calle de Embajadores, Paseo de Santa María de la Cabeza and Paseo de la Yeserías (parallel to the Manzanares), at the entrance of Arganzuela Park. 

Acacias borders with the districts of Centro (north-west), Carabanchel (south-east) and with the Arganzuelan wards of Imperial (west), Palos de Moguer (north-east), Las Delicias (a single point in the east) and La Chopera (south-east).

Some important buildings located at its limits are the Bridge of Toledo (Puente de Toledo), between the Paseo de la Yeserias and the Calle de Toledo; and the Gate of Toledo (Puerta de Toledo), between the Calle de Toledo and the Ronda de Toledo.

Transport
Las Acacias is served by the Metro Line 5 stations of Puerta de Toledo, Acacias and Pirámides. It is also served by the Cercanías (commuter rail) stations of Pirámides and Embajadores.

Photogallery

References

External links
 Orthophoto of the district of Arganzuela (Las Acacias is the n. 22)

Wards of Madrid
Arganzuela